Betty Green Brook flows into West Canada Creek north of Nobleboro in Herkimer County, New York.

References

Rivers of Hamilton County, New York
Rivers of New York (state)
Rivers of Herkimer County, New York